Ludwig Leinberger (21 May 1903 – 3 March 1943) was a German footballer. He won 24 caps for Germany in the Interwar period. He was also part of Germany's team at the 1928 Summer Olympics.

Called up for service in the German army in 1941, he died in a military hospital during World War II after surgery for appendicitis.

References

External links
 
 
 

1903 births
Footballers from Nuremberg
German footballers
Germany international footballers
Olympic footballers of Germany
Footballers at the 1928 Summer Olympics
SpVgg Greuther Fürth players
1943 deaths
Association football defenders
German Army personnel killed in World War II
German Army soldiers of World War II
Military personnel from Nuremberg